Cardinal Peak is the highest peak of the Chelan Mountains, a subrange of the Cascade Range in the U.S. state of Washington. It is located in Wenatchee National Forest at the head of the Entiat River drainage basin, in Chelan County. To the west and north, streams flow into Lake Chelan. Its  prominence ranks 132nd in the state.

The rocks of Cardinal Peak are mainly granodiorite and hornblende quartz diorite, minerals of the Cardinal Peak pluton.

History
Cardinal Peak was named by Albert H. Sylvester because it is the highest peak in the region.

See also
List of mountains of the United States
List of mountains by elevation

References

Mountains of Washington (state)
Cascade Range
Mountains of Chelan County, Washington